This is a list of prime ministers of Eswatini since the formation of the post in 1967.

Eleven people have been Prime Minister of Eswatini, plus seven acting prime ministers. One person, Barnabas Sibusiso Dlamini, held two non-consecutive terms.

The current prime minister is Cleopas Dlamini, who was appointed by King Mswati III at the Ludzidzini Royal Village on 19 July 2021.

List of officeholders
Political parties

Other factions

Status

Timeline

See also 

 List of monarchs of Eswatini
 Lists of office-holders

References

External links
 World Statesmen – Eswatini (Swaziland)

Politics of Eswatini
Government of Eswatini
 
Eswatini
1967 establishments in Swaziland